Anania desistalis is a moth in the family Crambidae. It was described by Francis Walker in 1862. It is found in Brazil.

References

Moths described in 1862
Pyraustinae
Moths of South America